Thennilavu ( Honeymoon) is an Indian-Tamil soap opera that was aired on Sun TV. The show premiered on 26 August 2013 and aired during weekdays. The show starred Thirumurugan, Sarvan Rajesh, Delhi Ganesh, Neema and Siva Ranjani. The show was aired again in YouTube from 29 March 2021. The show is produced by Thiru Pictures Thirumurugan and directed by E.Vikkramathithan.

Plot
Thennilavu is set in a holiday cottage in Kodiakanal following four couples' honeymoon routine. The four couples include a couple who always plan to murder the other, a couple who are stopped getting closer by their family members, a couple who suffers from Sleepwalking and an old couple who recently got remarried.

Cast

Thirumurugan/Sarvan Rajesh as Kalyanam
Neema as Meena
Delhi Ganesh as Rajasekhar
Muthu Kumara Swamy as Ram
Siva Ranjani as Revathi
Annamalai Palaniappan as Suchu
Sangeetha Shetty as Vino
 Deepa Nethran 
 Kannan as Alex
Aravamudhan Venkatesan as Tirupati
Ramjee S as the doctor
Rekha Padmanaban as Agalya

See also
 List of programs broadcast by Sun TV

References

External links
 Official Website 
 Sun TV on YouTube
 Sun TV Network 
 Sun Group 

Sun TV original programming
Tamil-language romance television series
Tamil-language comedy television series
Tamil-language thriller television series
2013 Tamil-language television series debuts
Tamil-language television shows
2014 Tamil-language television series endings